Miss Europe 2001, was the 54th edition of the Miss Europe pageant and the 43rd edition under the Mondial Events Organization. It was held at the Beirut International Exhibition & Leisure Center in Beirut, Lebanon on December 29, 2001. Élodie Gossuin of France, was crowned Miss Europe 2001 by out going titleholder Yelena Rogozhina of Russia.

Results

Placements

Special awards

Contestants 

 - Gentiana Ramadani
 - Irina Tovmasian
 - Alesya Shmigel'skaya
 - Ann Van Elsen
 - Sanja Plese
 - Karla Milinovic
 - Despina Romanaki
 - Ema Černáková
 - Mary Nordman
 - Ragne Sinikas
 - Susanna Tervaniemi
 -  Élodie Gossuin
 - Ana Ashvetiya
 - Katharina Berndt
 - Eleftheria Pantelidaki
 - Irena Pantelic
 - Palma Perenyi
 - Íris Björk Árnadóttir
 - Julija Djadenko
 - Maja Georgieva
 - Loredana Zammit
 - Yuliya Shavelyeva
 - Adriana Gerczew
 - Corina Nicoleta Tulan
 - Oksana Kalandyrets
 - Marzia Bellesso
 - Lucia Pilkova
 - Anja Slatinsek
 - Verónica Martín García
 - Elisabeth Halle
 - Suna Azak
 - Kseniya Kuz'menko
 - Nevena Djordjevic

References

External links 
 

Miss Europe
2001 beauty pageants
2001 in Lebanon